The Portuguese National Road Race Championships have been held since 1923.

Men

Women

See also
Portuguese National Time Trial Championships
National road cycling championships

Notes

References

National road cycling championships
Cycle races in Portugal
Recurring sporting events established in 1923
1923 establishments in Portugal